Epibacterium multivorans is an aerobic bacteria bacterium from the genus of Epibacterium which has been isolated from seawater from the beach of Malvarrosa in Spain.

References 

Rhodobacteraceae
Bacteria described in 2012